Ancylolomia drosogramma is a moth in the family Crambidae. It was described by Edward Meyrick in 1936. It is found in the Democratic Republic of the Congo.

References

Ancylolomia
Moths described in 1936
Moths of Africa